Old Mexico most commonly refers to the country of Mexico. The term may also refer to:

Places

Modern designations

Mexico
Valley of Mexico region, referred to in ancient times as Anahuac
Mexico City, in the State of Mexico
Northern Mexico, including Baja California, Baja California Sur, Chihuahua, Coahuila, Durango, Nuevo León, Sinaloa, Sonora and Tamaulipas

United States
Parts of the United States are sometimes referred to as Old Mexico
California, formerly The Californias
New Mexico, formerly Nuevo México, itself sometimes referred to as “Old New Mexico”
Pueblos, namesake of Nuevo México, their advanced trading network once connected with the Valley of Mexico, their network became part of El Camino Real
Texas, formerly Spanish Texas and Coahuila y Tejas

Historical designations
Tenochtitlan, the altepetl of the Mexica people
Aztec Empire, an empire formed in 1428 that lasted until 1521

In film
In Old Mexico, 1938 American Western film
Belle of Old Mexico, 1950 American film
A Night in Old Mexico, 2013 Spanish-American film

In music
"The Seashores of Old Mexico", 1971 song written by Merle Haggard, recorded by Hank Snow
Seashores of Old Mexico, 1987 studio album by Merle Haggard and Willie Nelson

See also
Mexico (disambiguation)
New Mexico (disambiguation)